Sunalini N Menon is Asia's first woman professional in the field of coffee tasting, also known as coffee cupping. She has been called "Asia's first lady of coffee".

Career 
Until 1995, Menon was the director of quality control for the Coffee Board of India. following this, she founded her own company, Coffeelab, in Bangalore, India.  In 2005, she received a Lifetime Achievement Award at the International Women’s Coffee Alliance (IWCA) in Seattle, United States.

References 

Businesswomen from Tamil Nadu
Year of birth missing (living people)
Living people
Product testers
Businesspeople from Tamil Nadu